The Mines and Geo-sciences Bureau (MGB) is a government agency of the Philippines under the Department of Environment and Natural Resources (DENR). The MGB is responsible for the conservation, management, development and use of the country's mineral resources, including those in reservations and public lands.

The MGB absorbed the functions of the Bureau of Mines and Geosciences, except for line functions, which transferred mainly to DENR regional offices. MGB also absorbed the functions of the abolished Mineral Resources Development Board (MRDB), and the Gold Mining Industry Assistance Board (GMIAB).

History 
MGB took charge of the administration and disposition of minerals and mineral lands during the Spanish Regime, but was abolished on July 1, 1886. It was transfigured during Gen. Emilio Aguinaldo's ruling and created four divisions of Departamento de Fomento, under the Philippine Revolutionary Republic. The Mines and Mountains Sections were also formed; the former was under the director of Industry and Agriculture, and the later was under the director of Obras Publicas (Department of Public Works & Highways).

The sections were re-organised after the Americans’ arrival, resulting in the emergence of the Mining Bureau. In 1905, the Mining Bureau and the Bureau of Government Laboratories were fused under the Bureau of Science, and the Mining Bureau became the Division of Geology and Mines. In 1933, the Mineral Lands Division of the Bureau of Lands was merged with the Division of Geology and Mines, under the Bureau of Science, to form a division known as the Division of Mineral Resources under the Department of Agriculture and Commerce. After one year, it was renamed Division of Mines.

With the outbreak of the Second World War, the Bureau of Mines was reconstituted under the Department of Agriculture and Commerce under Executive Order No. 1 dated January 30, 1942. In 1944, during the Puppet Philippine Republic, the Bureau of Mines shrunk again into a Division of the Department of Agriculture and Natural Resources. The revision of Commonwealth Act No. 136 in 1978 boosted it again, it was renamed Bureau of Mines and Geo-sciences Bureau. This gave it an additional function, as well as the authority to make it more responsive to the objectives of the government's minerals sector.

In June 1987, the MGB was formed under Executive Order No. 192.

In 1997, under DAO 97–11, the MGB implemented a full re-organisation specifically involving the establishment of two new divisions—the Mining Environment and Safety Division, and the Mine Tenement Management Division. These divisions operationalised the sustainable development principles provision of the Mining Act of 1995.

Services

Legal Service Division 
The Legal Service Division (LSD) gives legal services to the MGB so that laws, rules and regulations, and policies about the management and acquisition of mineral lands and resources can be put into place in an effective and efficient way.

Mining Tenements Management Division 
The Mining Tenements Management Division (MTMD) is responsible for conducting the final review of all mining applications, auditing the disposal of mineral lands and resources, and managing the Mineral Rights Management System.

Sections 

 Mining Permit Evaluation Section
 Systems Audit Development
 Mineral Rights Management System Section
 Mineral Lands Survey Section
 Mining Contract Evaluation Section

Mine Safety, Environment and Social Development Division 
The Mine Safety, Environment, and Social Development Division (MSESDD) are responsible for investigating incidents and complaints and conducting research and development to improve mine safety and health programs, environmental management, and social development.

Sections 

 Mine Environmental Management Section
 Mine Environmental Audit Section
 Mine Rehabilitation Section
 Social Development Section
 Mine Safety and Health Section

Mining Technology Division 
The Mining Technology Division (MTD) is responsible for conducting Research and Development for the development of mining technologies, providing and coordinating mining technology support services, enforcing the technology transfer provisions of existing laws, rules, and regulations, implementing the National Small-Scale Mining Programs, and aiding in the investigation of complaints (including illegal mining activities).

Sections 

 Mining Technology Development Section
 Mine Evaluation and Enforcement Section
 Small-Scale Mining Development Section 
 Mineral Reserves Inventory Section

Lands Geological Survey Division 
The Lands Geological Survey division does basic geological mapping, which serves as input for mineral exploration, energy exploration, water resources, geohazard assessment, engineering geology, environmental geology, and urban planning. It conducts engineering geological and geohazard assessments for housing, subdivision, infrastructure, and other land development projects. It addresses water-related concerns and assesses possible waste disposal sites. It is in charge of creating, maintaining, and enhancing geological database systems for the MGB.

Sections 

 General Geology Section
 Economic Geology Section
 Hydrogeology and Environmental Geology Section
 Geological Laboratory Services Section
 Lands Geological Information Management Section
 Geohazard Assessment and Engineering Geology Section

Marine Geological Survey Division 
The Marine Geological Survey Division conducts coastal and marine geological and geophysical surveys for mineral resource assessment, coastal geohazard assessment, geo-environmental and geoengineering studies for coastal infrastructure projects, and related geoscientific concerns. The Division also conducts research on marine geological technology and methodology, marine geology, and marine geophysics. It provides technical services concerning the conduct of marine geological and geophysical surveys.

Sections 

 Coastal and Offshore Geological Survey Section
 Marine Geological Information Management Section
 Marine Technical Services Section
 Marine Mineral Exploration Section

Metallurgical Technology Division 
The Metallurgical Technology Division (MeTD) is responsible for developing metallurgical techniques for beneficiating/extracting minerals/metals from ores, providing metallurgical and analytical services to the different mining stakeholders, and auditing mineral processing operations.

Sections 

 Mineral Processing Service and Audit Section
 Mineral Processing Research and Development Section
 Chemical Laboratory Service Section
 Mechanical-Electrical Service Section

Mineral Economics, Information and Publication Division 
The Mineral Economics, Information, and Publications Division (MEIPD) are responsible for conducting policy studies on mineral economics and disseminating data on mining and geosciences.

Sections 

 Mineral Statistics Section
 Mineral Economics Section
 Mineral Information and Publication Section
 Library

Planning, Policy and International Affairs Division 
The Planning, Policy, and International Affairs Division (PPIAD) are responsible for planning, programming, monitoring, and evaluating programs/projects/activities; initiating policy formulation; coordinating the development and implementation of programs/projects and policy formulation; initiating, coordinating, and maintaining international cooperation and commitments; and coordinating the design, installation, and maintenance of national and regional management information systems.

Sections 

 Policy Studies and Project Development
 Planning and Monitoring
 Information System Group

Financial Management Division 
The Financial Management Division (FMD) will provide financial analysis to assist in planning, monitoring, and decision-making.

Sections 

 Budget
 Financial Service Group

Administrative Division 
The Administrative Division (AD) is responsible for personnel, property, and record administration.

Sections 

 Human Resource Management Section
 Cashiering Section
 General Services Section
 Property Management Section
 Records Management Section
 Engineering Service Unit
 Bids and Awards Committee (BAC)

Regional Offices 
Currently, there are 15 regional bureau offices in the entire country.

References

External links
Mines and Geosciences Bureau website
Department of Environment and Natural Resources website

Department of Environment and Natural Resources (Philippines)